Bindu is a term meaning "point" or "dot". Bindu may also refer to:

 Bindu (symbol)
 Bindu, India, village in Darjeeling district of West Bengal India
 Anusvara, a diacritical mark represented as a bindu or dot
 Bindu (2009 film), a 2009 Sri Lankan Sinhala children's film

People
 Bindu (actress) (born 1941), Indian actress with over 160 acting credits
 Bindu (Bangladeshi actress) (born 1988), Bangladeshi actress
 Bindu Madhavi (born 1986), Indian model and actress in Tamil and Telugu films
 Bindu Panicker (born 1968), Indian actress in Malayalam films
 R. Bindu, former mayor of Thrissur Municipal Corporation
 Bindu Bhatt (born 1954), Indian novelist and short story writer
 Bindu of Bukhara (died 681), king of Bukhara
 Bindu Madhav Pathak (1935–2004), Indian musician